The Honda Airwave is a subcompact car produced by the Japanese automaker Honda from 2005 until 2010. It is a five-door station wagon version of the first-generation City/Fit Aria and Fit/Jazz, which was a sedan and a hatchback respectively. The Airwave was built on the Global Small Car platform; however, unlike the City and Fit, the Airwave was unique to the Japanese market. Honda announced the debut of the Airwave on April 7, 2005.

Production ended in August 2010. Its successor, the Honda Fit Shuttle, went on sale in June 2011.

Models 
The Airwave was sold in two trim lines, the basic "G" model, and the well-equipped "L" model. Each of the trim lines had an optional panoramic-glass sunroof that covered a large part of the roof. Each version of the car was available in either front-wheel drive or four-wheel drive.

It was also sold as the Honda Partner (series GJ3/GJ4) panel van between March 10, 2006 and August 2010 in Japan. Essentially a decontented version of the Airwave, the Partner utilized a different 1.5 L engine, the L15A i-DSI (unlike the VTEC engine in the Airwave), mated to a five-speed automatic transmission identical to that found in the North American market Fit.

Drivetrain 

The Airwave was powered by the largest version of Honda's L-series engine family, the 1,496 cc 1.5 L VTEC L15A gasoline engine. The engine produced a maximum output of 81 kW (109 hp) at 5,800 rpm and a maximum torque of 143 Nm (105 lb·ft) of torque at 4,800 rpm. 

Two forms of a continuously variable transmission (CVT) were available on the Airwave. The "G" trim line had a standard CVT, while the "L" sported a CVT with seven-speed mode which allowed the driver to choose between the smooth, shiftless acceleration of a standard CVT, or the added option of shifting through seven computer-controlled "gears".

Interior 

The interior versatility of the Airwave was similar to its smaller sibling, the Fit. By moving the fuel tank underneath the front row of seats, space was freed up in the rear for a flexible seating system. Like the Fit, the Airwave had five different seating modes.

Ultra Seat: The fuel tank and rear suspension layout also allows a multiple-mode seating system, marketed by Honda as Ultra Seat (Asia) and Magic Seat (North America, Oceania), with four seating modes — and a fifth in certain markets:

Normal: seats were in their normal position with seating for five.
Utility: Either section (or both) of the 60:40 split rear seat sank down into the rear foot well as the rear seat back was lowered forward. This offered a low, perfectly flat surface that increased the cargo area substantially.
Long: The rear seat folded down similar to utility mode, but the front passenger seat folded backward, leaving an area that could hold items as long as 2.7 meters (8.9 ft).
Tall: Either section (or both) of the rear seat cushion folded up against the rear seat back, allowing for an area of 1.25 meters (4.1 ft) in height.
Refresh: With the headrest of the front seats removed, the front seat backs could be folded down to form a lounge-style sitting area.

Sales 
The Airwave started its sales from Apr 7th, 2005.

Sales Figures in the Japanese domestic market:

All of them were sold in the Japanese market; however, some of them were exported as parallel imports to some countries (e.g., Hong Kong, Macau, Singapore, Thailand, Pakistan, and New Zealand).

References

External links 

Honda Airwave official site
Honda Airwave informational site
Russian Honda Airwave Club
Honda Partner

Airwave
Subcompact cars
Station wagons
Vehicles with CVT transmission
All-wheel-drive vehicles
Cars introduced in 2005
2010s cars